Blackfriars is an outer-city suburb of Salford in Greater Manchester, England. It is situated along the banks of the River Irwell, close to the traditional centre of Salford at Greengate, between Manchester City Centre and Broughton. Blackfriars contains Blackfriars Park, one of Salford's smaller parks, and is home to the Friars Primary School.

Due to slum clearance very few buildings in Blackfriars now predate the 1960s. One notable exception is the 1871-built tavern on Blackfriars Road, which has now been converted into homes for shared ownership.

References 

Areas of Salford